Crataegus laciniata is a species of hawthorn found in Morocco, Algeria, Spain and Sicily.

Authorship issues
Over the years a number of author's names (auct. mult.) have become associated with the name Crataegus laciniata. Some may be erroneous, and some may have been synonymized:
Crataegus laciniata Besser
Crataegus laciniata Borkh.
Crataegus laciniata Kar. & Kir.
Crataegus laciniata Montrouz.
Crataegus laciniata Stev.
Crataegus laciniata Steven ex Besser
Crataegus laciniata Willk.

References

laciniata
Plants described in 1793